Westdale may refer to:

Australia
Westdale, New South Wales, a suburb of Tamworth, New South Wales
West Dale, Western Australia

Canada
Westdale, Ontario, a residential neighbourhood in Hamilton
Westdale Secondary School, a high school
Ancaster—Dundas—Flamborough—Westdale, a federal and provincial electoral district in Ontario

United States
Westdale, Los Angeles, California, a neighborhood in Los Angeles
Westdale, Texas, a census-designated place in Jim Wells County
Westdale Mall, an enclosed shopping mall in Cedar Rapids, Iowa